Elaphocera emarginata is a species of dung beetles belonging to the family Scarabaeidae.

Description
Body is brown-black, while females are usually reddish. The basis of the pronotum is hairy.

Distribution
This species is endemic to Sardinia.

References

Scarabaeidae
Beetles described in 1817
Endemic fauna of Sardinia